Maryan Ihorovych Zakalnytskyy (born 19 August 1994 in Verkhnia, Ivano-Frankivsk Oblast, Ukraine) is a Ukrainian race walker. He is the current European champion in the 50 km walk.

Career 
He started his sporting career in Kalush. In 2013 he moved to Kyiv.

In 2018, he won gold medal in the men's 50 kilometres walk at the 2018 European Athletics Championships held in Berlin, Germany.

He studied at the State Pedagogical University in Pereiaslav-Khmelnytskyi.

Achievements

References

External links

1994 births
Living people
Ukrainian male racewalkers
European Athletics Championships medalists
European Athletics Championships winners
Athletes (track and field) at the 2020 Summer Olympics
Olympic athletes of Ukraine
Sportspeople from Ivano-Frankivsk Oblast